The Alaska Plain, also referred to as the Alaskan Plain or Alaskan Abyssal Plain, is an oceanic basin under the Gulf of Alaska.

See also
List of submarine topographical features

References

Geology of Alaska